Bikketti is a panchayat town in The Nilgiris district  in the state of Tamil Nadu, India.

Demographics
 India census, Bikketti had a population of 6850. Males constitute 49% of the population and females 51%. Bikketti has an average literacy rate of 71%, higher than the national average of 59.5%; with male literacy of 80% and female literacy of 62%. 9% of the population is under 6 years of age.

References

Cities and towns in Nilgiris district